Thomas A. Golden, Jr. (born March 5, 1971) is an American politician who is the city manager of Lowell, Massachusetts. He previously represented the 16th Middlesex District in the Massachusetts House of Representatives, where he was the Co-Chair of the Joint Committee on Telecommunications, Utilities and Energy.

See also
 2019–2020 Massachusetts legislature
 2021–2022 Massachusetts legislature

References

|-

1971 births
Democratic Party members of the Massachusetts House of Representatives
Politicians from Lowell, Massachusetts
University of Massachusetts Lowell alumni
Living people
21st-century American politicians